Rudolph Blair Welch (July 23, 1850 – October 12, 1906) was an American educator and attorney most notable for serving as the fourth president of the Kansas State Normal School (KSN), now known as Emporia State University, in Emporia, Kansas.

Biography

Early life and career
Rudolph Blair Welch was born on July 23, 1850, in Spencerville, Indiana. Welch graduated from Illinois Wesleyan University in 1877 with an education degree. After graduating, Welch immediately became the superintendent of schools in Pontiac, Illinois, serving for 12 years.

Kansas State Normal presidency
On August 20, 1879, just fourteen days after Charles Rhodes Pomeroy's resignation, Welch became the fourth president of the Kansas State Normal School. In 1878, a year before he became president, a fire and tornado struck the administration building on campus. Shortly after taking over as president, the school built two temporary buildings due to the tornado and fire the previous year.

Welch traveled the state of Kansas to promote the school and under Welch's guidance, enrollment grew. On March 6, 1882, Welch resigned to practice law, which would be effective June 30, 1882.

References

External links

Presidents of Emporia State University
Illinois Wesleyan University alumni
20th-century American lawyers
Educators from Illinois
1850 births
1906 deaths
People from Pontiac, Illinois
People from DeKalb County, Indiana
Burials in Kansas